Tecumseh is a city in Pottawatomie County, Oklahoma. The population was 6,457 at the 2010 census, a 5.9 percent increase from the figure of 6,098 in 2000. It was named for the noted Shawnee chief, Tecumseh, and was designated as the county seat at Oklahoma's statehood. A county-wide election moved the seat to Shawnee in 1930.

History

A 320-acre (129.5 hectare) site was opened for settlement September 23, 1891, as a result of the land run into reservations of the Sac and Fox, Kiowa, Kickapoo, Shawnee and Pottawatomi peoples. The townsite, named Tecumseh by a U.S. Army Major, had been designated as the seat of County "B" in the newly formed Oklahoma Territory by the Department of the Interior on July 17, 1891. A post office was established in the town on September 18, 1891.

In 1903 the Atchison, Topeka and Santa Fe Railway began serving Tecumseh's surrounding agricultural region, in which cotton was the main crop. Cotton production dropped in the 1920s because of depressed prices and a boll weevil infestation. The population declined for a time after 1930, because many townspeople moved away to earn a living elsewhere.

In 2002, the Supreme Court of the United States evaluated whether it was lawful to require students from Tecumseh schools to take drug tests in order to participate in extracurricular activities. In a 5–4 decision, the court ruled that the tests were allowable in Board of Education v. Earls.

2010 tornado 
On Monday May 10, 2010, the city was struck by an EF3 tornado. The city's southeast side sustained the most damage, with several homes along East Highland Street were severely damaged or destroyed. Three churches were also damaged. The tornado was the first to strike the town since the May 17, 1981, tornado that hit the rural southern part of the town and was the first tornado to go through the city proper since records have been kept in 1950.

Geography
Tecumseh is located at  (35.262346, -96.934830).

Demographics

As of the census of 2000, there were 6,098 people, 2,344 households, and 1,654 families residing in the city. The population density was 405.5 people per square mile (156.5/km). There were 2,565 housing units at an average density of 170.6 per square mile (65.8/km). The racial makeup of the city was 78.98% White, 2.05% African American, 12.87% Native American, 0.18% Asian, 0.02% Pacific Islander, 0.46% from other races, and 5.44% from two or more races. Hispanic or Latino of any race were 1.77% of the population.

There were 2,344 households, out of which 34.0% had children under the age of 18 living with them, 54.1% were married couples living together, 12.7% had a female householder with no husband present, and 29.4% were non-families. 26.3% of all households were made up of individuals, and 13.9% had someone living alone who was 65 years of age or older. The average household size was 2.52 and the average family size was 3.04.

In the city, the population was spread out, with 28.4% under the age of 18, 8.6% from 18 to 24, 25.8% from 25 to 44, 20.6% from 45 to 64, and 16.7% who were 65 years of age or older. The median age was 35 years. For every 100 females, there were 90.5 males. For every 100 females age 18 and over, there were 83.9 males.

The median income for a household in the city was $27,202, and the median income for a family was $32,235. Males had a median income of $26,250 versus $20,820 for females. The per capita income for the city was $14,300. About 15.0% of families and 16.6% of the population were below the poverty line, including 20.3% of those under age 18 and 14.8% of those age 65 or over.

Government
The city of Tecumseh has a home rule charter form of government.

The Central Oklahoma Juvenile Center (COJC), located in Tecumseh, is an Oklahoma Office of Juvenile Affairs correctional facility that holds both boys and girls. is located on a  plat of land and occupies  of it. The school opened in 1917 and was under the Oklahoma Office of Juvenile Affairs since 1995; previously it was in the Oklahoma Department of Human Services. It previously served as an orphanage and mental health center in addition to being a juvenile correctional facility. Known by its current name since 1992, it was previously known as Girls Town, the Oklahoma State Industrial School for Incorrigible Girls, the State Industrial School for White Girls, Russell Industrial School, and Central Oklahoma Juvenile Treatment Center.

Notable people 

 Terry Allen, big band vocalist
 Mary Fallin, 27th governor of Oklahoma and 14th lieutenant governor of Oklahoma
 Mike McClure, musician and founding member of The Great Divide
 Ruben Rivers, United States Army officer and Medal of Honor recipient

Notes

References

External links
 City of Tecumseh/Chamber of Commerce
 Tecumseh Public Schools
 Tecumseh Countywide News
 Tecumseh Public Library

Oklahoma City metropolitan area
Cities in Pottawatomie County, Oklahoma
1891 establishments in Oklahoma Territory
Populated places established in 1891
Cities in Oklahoma